Garri-ye Ab Kenaru (also Romanized as Garrī-ye Āb Kenārū; also known as Garrī, Garrī-ye Pā’īn, Garrī-ye Soflá, Gerrey, and Karreh) is a village in Charam Rural District, in the Central District of Charam County, Kohgiluyeh and Boyer-Ahmad Province, Iran. At the 2006 census, its population was 220, in 37 families.

References 

Populated places in Charam County